Leon Aderemi Balogun (born 28 June 1988) is a professional footballer who plays as a defender for Queens Park Rangers and the Nigeria national team. Balogun has previously played for Türkiyemspor Berlin, Hannover 96, Werder Bremen, Fortuna Düsseldorf, Darmstadt 98, Mainz 05, Brighton & Hove Albion, Wigan Athletic and Rangers.

Club career

Early career
He made his Bundesliga debut on 19 April 2009 for Hannover 96 in a game against Hamburger SV.

After his contract with 2. Bundesliga side Fortuna Düsseldorf expired in summer 2014, he was without a club for three months until he joined fellow leaguer Darmstadt 98. He signed a contract until the end of the 2014–15 season.

Brighton & Hove Albion
On 22 May 2018, Balogun signed a two-year deal with Premier League club Brighton & Hove Albion.

Balogun made his competitive debut for the Sussex club coming on as an early substitute against Manchester United replacing injured Lewis Dunk. The Seagulls went on to beat United 3–2 at Falmer Stadium.

He scored his first goal for the Albion to make it 2–0 against bitter rivals Crystal Palace at Falmer Stadium where he scored in 25 seconds after being subbed on replacing Pascal Groß as a result of a Shane Duffy red card for head butting. The game finished 3–1 to the Albion to claim the boasting rights in the M23 derby.

On 27 August 2019, Balogun played in his first ever EFL Cup match in a 2–1 away win over Bristol Rovers.

Wigan Athletic
Balogun signed for Wigan Athletic on 31 January 2020 on a six-month loan deal. On 25 June 2020, he signed a short term permanent contract with the Latics until the end of the 2019–20 season.

Rangers
Balogun signed for Scottish Premiership club Rangers on 24 July 2020 on a one-year contract, with an option in the club's favour to extend for a further year. He made his debut for Rangers a week later, on 1 August, in a Scottish Premiership match against Aberdeen where he impressed during a 1–0 win. During February 2021, he deputised at right back after an injury to club captain James Tavernier and the suspension of reserve player Nathan Patterson. Balogun previously played at right back earlier in his career when in Germany. 

On 9 April 2021, Balogun signed a new one-year contract with Rangers. He scored his first goal for the club on 27 October 2021, in a Europa League group stage match against Brøndby IF. Balogun left Rangers in June 2022 after his contract expired, with his final appearance coming in their 2022 Scottish Cup Final victory. Rangers legend Ally McCoist commented two months later that he had been "surprised" by Balogun's departure, and suggested that the club should re-sign him.

QPR
Balogun signed a one-year contract with Queens Park Rangers on 26 August 2022. He scored his first goal for the club on 22 October 2022, which proved to be the winner, against his former club Wigan Athletic.

International career

Born to a Nigerian father and German mother, Balogun was called up by Nigeria for a March 2014 friendly against Mexico as a replacement for Joseph Yobo. Balogun entered at half-time, but was injured after 20 minutes in a collision with signage on the touchline. He fractured his foot and was set to miss 2–3 months after surgery. However, he later confirmed to news media that his injury did not require surgery.

On 25 March 2015, he played his second game for Nigeria in a 1–0 loss against Uganda.
He played his third game for the country on 13 June 2015 when he featured in a 2–0 win over Chad in the opening game of qualifying for the 2017 African Nations Cup.

In June 2018, he was named in Nigeria's final 23-man squad for the 2018 FIFA World Cup in Russia. Balogun played in every minute of the three games Nigeria played in, including a 2–0 win over Iceland, but were eliminated after finishing 3rd in their group.

Balogun was included in Nigeria's squad for the 2019 Africa Cup of Nations. His first appearance in the competition came in Nigeria's second group game against Guinea in which Nigeria won 1–0 to seal qualification into the knockouts. Balogun made 4 appearances in the competition where The Super Eagles finished as bronze medallists.

Personal life
Balogun was born in Berlin, West Germany to a Nigerian-Yoruba father and a German mother. Balogun was raised Roman Catholic and sent to Catholic school from a young age, but he resented his strict upbringing and became an atheist in his formative years. However, during the hardships of early footballing career Balogun started believing in God again and is now a devout Christian. Balogun speaks fluent English and German, but does not speak Yoruba, the language of his father as his parents tried to assimilate him into German culture.

In November 2019 Balogun said there needed to be a collective response from players to racism in football.

Career statistics

Club

International

Scores and results list Nigeria's goal tally first, score column indicates score after each Balogun goal.

Honours

Rangers
Scottish Premiership: 2020–21
Scottish Cup: 2021–22
 UEFA Europa League runner-up: 2021–22

Nigeria
Africa Cup of Nations third place: 2019

References

External links

1988 births
Living people
German Christians
Nigerian Christians
Converts to Christianity from atheism or agnosticism
Footballers from Berlin
Citizens of Nigeria through descent
German footballers
Nigerian footballers
Association football defenders
Nigeria international footballers
2018 FIFA World Cup players
2019 Africa Cup of Nations players
Türkiyemspor Berlin players
Hannover 96 II players
Hannover 96 players
SV Werder Bremen II players
SV Werder Bremen players
Fortuna Düsseldorf II players
Fortuna Düsseldorf players
SV Darmstadt 98 players
1. FSV Mainz 05 players
1. FSV Mainz 05 II players
Brighton & Hove Albion F.C. players
Wigan Athletic F.C. players
Rangers F.C. players
Regionalliga players
Bundesliga players
3. Liga players
2. Bundesliga players
Premier League players
English Football League players
Scottish Professional Football League players
German expatriate footballers
Nigerian expatriate footballers
German expatriate sportspeople in England
Nigerian expatriate sportspeople in England
Expatriate footballers in England
German expatriate sportspeople in Scotland
Nigerian expatriate sportspeople in Scotland
Expatriate footballers in Scotland
German sportspeople of Nigerian descent
German people of Yoruba descent
Nigerian people of German descent
Yoruba sportspeople
Queens Park Rangers F.C. players